Stadium Lille-Métropole is a multi-purpose stadium in Villeneuve-d'Ascq, France. The stadium was built in 1976 and is able to hold 18,154 spectators. The architect of the stadium was Roger Taillibert.

It was used as the temporary home stadium of Lille OSC before the completion of the nearby Stade Pierre-Mauroy. It was also the home stadium of ES Wasquehal, when the club played in Ligue 2 and National, between 1995 and 2005.

The stadium has hosted several rugby matches, including France versus Argentina in 1988 and the Wallabies in 1989, All Blacks versus Canada in the 1991 Rugby World Cup quarter-finals, French Barbarians versus Springboks in 1992, Stade Français versus Scarlets in the 1998–99 Heineken Cup and the semi final of the 2000-01 Heineken Cup between Stade Français and Munster.

Also, the venue has an athletics track, which hosted the 2002 IPC Athletics World Championships and 2011 World Youth Championships in Athletics, as well as the annual Meeting Lille-Métropole.

AC/DC concluded their For Those About to Rock Tour at the stadium on December 20, 1982.

Pink Floyd performed at the stadium during their A Momentary Lapse of Reason Tour on July 28, 1988.

References

External links
 Lille OSC's website, which includes pictures of the stadium (in French)

Lille-Metropole
Lille-Metropole
Rugby World Cup stadiums
Multi-purpose stadiums in France
Athletics (track and field) venues in France
Buildings and structures in Villeneuve-d'Ascq
Sports venues completed in 1976
Sports venues in Nord (French department)
Sports venues in Lille